Australian singer-songwriter Washington has released four studio albums, nine extended plays, and thirty singles (including two as a featured artist and two charity singles). 
 
In 2006, in collaboration with jazz pianist, Sean Foran, Washington released her debut EP Nightlight. The EP won the 2008 Australian Jazz Bell Award for Best Australian Jazz Vocal Album. She released her second EP, Bennetts Lane, with pianist Paul Grabowsky in 2007. Her musical style moved away from jazz when she began backing a blues and roots musician, Old Man River, as the keyboardist and backing vocalist. 

In July 2010, Washington released her debut album. I Believe You Liar. The album was a commercial and critical success, peaking at number 3 on the ARIA Charts, and was certified platinum.

Studio albums

Extended plays

Singles

As lead artist

As featured artist

Charity singles

Other album appearances

Notes 
 a Released under Washington's full name, Megan Washington.
 b Sales of the single counted towards the EP.

References 

Washington, Megan